Lucinda Margaret Grealy (June 3, 1963 – December 18, 2002) was an Irish-American poet and memoirist who wrote Autobiography of a Face in 1994. This critically acclaimed book describes her childhood and early adolescent experience with cancer of the jaw, which left her with some facial disfigurement. In a 1994 interview with Charlie Rose conducted right before she rose to the height of her fame, Grealy stated that she considered her book to be primarily about the issue of "identity."

Life
Grealy was born in Dublin, Ireland, and her family moved to the United States in April 1967, settling in Spring Valley, New York.  She was diagnosed at age 9 with a rare form of cancer called Ewing's sarcoma. Treatment for this often fatal cancer (Grealy reports an estimated 5% survival rate using therapies available at the time of her diagnosis) led to the removal of her jawbone, and over the following years she had many facial reconstructive surgeries. In her memoir, Autobiography of a Face, Grealy describes her life from the time of her diagnosis and how she weathered the cruelty of schoolmates and others, suffering taunts and stares from strangers.

At 18, Grealy entered Sarah Lawrence College where she made her first real friends and nurtured her love of poetry.  She graduated in 1985 and went on to study at the Iowa Writers' Workshop. In Iowa she lived with fellow writer Ann Patchett. Their friendship is the subject of Patchett's 2004 memoir Truth and Beauty: A Friendship.

In 1991, she was awarded a Bunting Fellowship at the Radcliffe Institute for Independent Study, where she completed her memoir. In 1995, the book won Grealy a Whiting Award, given to young writers of exceptional talent.

She published a collection of essays in 2000, As Seen on TV: Provocations. She taught writing at Bennington College and New School University.

Following her final reconstructive surgery, Grealy became dependent upon her prescribed painkiller, OxyContin, as she had earlier with codeine.  She died of a heroin overdose on December 18, 2002, in New York City, at age 39.

Her sister, Suellen Grealy, was opposed to Ann Patchett's timing in publishing Truth and Beauty. While she claims that Patchett and the book's publisher HarperCollins stole the Grealy family's right to grieve privately, she acknowledges that "Ann was a far better 'sister' to Lucy than I could ever have been".

Awards
 1995 Whiting Award
Lucy Grealy won several prizes for her poetry, among them the Sonora Review Prize, the London TLS poetry prize and two Academy of American Poets awards.

Works
 Everyday Alibis, a chapbook of poems
 
  (Renamed British edition of Autobiography of a Face)

Anthologies

Essays

References

External links 
 Lucy Grealy interview with Charlie Rose
Profile at The Whiting Foundation

1963 births
2002 deaths
Irish emigrants to the United States
American essayists
20th-century American memoirists
American autobiographers
Deaths by heroin overdose in New York (state)
Iowa Writers' Workshop alumni
Sarah Lawrence College alumni
Bennington College faculty
People from Spring Valley, New York
20th-century essayists
Drug-related deaths in New York City
Women memoirists